Desulfovibrio capillatus  is a Gram-negative and sulfate-reducing bacterium from the genus of Desulfovibrio which has been isolated from an oil field separator in the Gulf of Mexico.

References

External links
Type strain of Desulfovibrio capillatus at BacDive -  the Bacterial Diversity Metadatabase	

Bacteria described in 2013
Desulfovibrio